Finette Agyapong (born 1 February 1997) is an English sprinter competing primarily in the 200 metres. She won a gold medal in the 200 metres at the 2017 European U23 Championships.

She currently holds the British record in the rarely contested indoor 300 metres race.

International competitions

Personal bests
Outdoor
100 metres – 11.49 (+1.9 m/s, Birmingham 2017)
200 metres – 22.86 (+1.3 m/s, Bydgoszcz 2017)
300 metres – 36.86 (Newham 2017)
400 metres – 52.41 (Willesden 2017)
Indoor
60 metres – 7.35 (Birmingham 2018)
200 metres – 23.30 (Birmingham 2018)
300 metres – 37.74 (Ostrava 2018) NR

References

1997 births
Living people
English female sprinters
British female sprinters
Athletes (track and field) at the 2018 Commonwealth Games
English people of Ghanaian descent
Athletes from London
Commonwealth Games competitors for England